Patan Thi Pakistan is a 2013 Gujarati film, starring Vikram Thakor, Pranjal Bhatt and Firoz Irani. Jaimini Trivedi, Paresh Bhatt, Bimal Trivedi, Kaushika Goswami, Rohit Mehta and Trambak Joshi acted in supporting role. Directed by Haresh Patel and produced by Govindbhai Patel, The film tells the story of an inter-religious couple. It was released on 1 November 2013 and was a blockbuster of the year. The film is loosely based on 2001 Hindi film Gadar: Ek Prem Katha.

Plot
The film's story follows a Pakistani girl (Pranjal Bhatt) who comes to India for Jihadi mission and falls in love with Indian Gujarati boy (Vikram Thakor). She decides to marry with him against her family's wish.

Release
The movie was released in 2013, and became a blockbuster of the year. It was screened again in 2017 on the Independence Day.

The film was shot in Patan.

Accolades
The film received 12 nominations at Transmedia Award 2014 in different categories.
Vikram Thakor won the Best Actor Award for the film, and Haresh Patel won the Best Director Award.

References

External links 
 

2013 films
2010s Gujarati-language films
Films shot in Gujarat
Indian interfaith romance films
India–Pakistan relations in popular culture
Films set in Gujarat
Films set in Pakistan
Films about jihadism
Patan district